The Canada Border Services Agency (CBSA; , ASFC) is a federal law enforcement agency that is responsible for border control (i.e. protection and surveillance), immigration enforcement, and customs services in Canada.

The CBSA is responsible to Parliament through the minister of public safety and emergency preparedness, currently Marco Mendicino, who took office following the 2021 election, and is under the direction of the president of the Canada Border Services Agency, Erin O’Gorman.

The Agency was created on December 12, 2003, by an order-in-council that amalgamated the customs function of the now-defunct Canada Customs and Revenue Agency, the enforcement function of Citizenship and Immigration Canada (now known as Immigration, Refugees and Citizenship Canada), and the port-of-entry examination function of the Canadian Food Inspection Agency (CFIA). The CBSA's creation was formalized by the Canada Border Services Agency Act, which received Royal Assent on November 3, 2005.

The CBSA oversees approximately 1,200 service locations across Canada, and 39 in other countries. It employs over 14,000 public servants and offers 24-hour service at 117 of its land border crossings and at 13 international airports. It works closely with Immigration, Refugees and Citizenship Canada to enforce immigration laws by facilitating the removal of inadmissible individuals from the country and assisting local police in the investigation of violations of the Immigration and Refugee Protection Act.

The Agency oversees operations at three major sea ports and three CBSA mail centres (CMC), and operates detention facilities, known as immigration holding centres (IHC), in Laval, Quebec; Toronto, Ontario; and Surrey, BC.

CBSA's Inland Enforcement branch tracks down and removes foreign nationals who are in Canada illegally. Inland Enforcement Officers are plainclothes units and are equipped with the same sidearm pistol (PX4D Storm chambered in 9×19mm Parabellum) as Border Services Officers (BSOs) found at ports of entry.

History 

Prior to 2004, border security in Canada was handled by three legacy agencies that performed individual functions:
Canada Customs and Revenue Agency (CCRA, now defunct), customs;
Citizenship and Immigration Canada (now IRCC), enforcement; and
Canadian Food Inspection Agency (CFIA), import inspection at ports of entry.

The auditor general identified the issues in having the responsibility of border security be divided, such as the inability for individual agencies to share certain security information, as well as ineffective inter-agency communication. Thus, in 2003, the border enforcement functions taken on by the separate agencies would consolidate into a singular organization, titled the Canada Border Services Agency. Originally, under CCRA, Canada Customs was joined with the country's revenue service, though the agency would primarily give its focus to tax collection. With the establishment of Border Services, CCRA's taxation responsibilities would break off into the Canada Revenue Agency, while its customs function would be absorbed entirely by the CBSA.

The agency has since undergone significant changes to its overall structure, as well as to its range of duties and institutional priorities.

Arming officers 
During its initial years, CBSA officers, just as their CCRA predecessors, were not equipped with firearms. This would be the case until 2006, when the Government of Canada would approve of the CBSA Arming Initiative, a 10-year strategy to arm and train Border Services Officers (BSOs).

One of the first significant policy changes to come to the agency was in allowing CBSA officers to arrest and detain individuals at the border for non-customs related violations of Canadian law. These responsibilities would eventually lead to the implementation of use of force policies, after which BSOs across Canada begun to carry collapsible batons, pepper spray, and handcuffs, though it would take several years before they could be equipped with firearms. The 2006 Canadian federal budget introduced  to equip BSOs with side arms and to eliminate single-person border crossings.

The sidearm of choice is the Beretta Px4 Storm.

Implementation 
In August 2006, Prime Minister Stephen Harper announced that arming BSOs would begin in early 2007 and would continue through 2016, marking the 10-year strategy. The arming of officers at Ports of Entry (POEs) across Canada was conducted systematically, with ports that were considered the busiest and/or most dangerous to be completed first. Some of the first officers to be armed were those working at Ontario's Windsor-Detroit POE, the busiest highway port of entry in Canada.

As of 2019, Border Services Officers at all POEs are issued duty firearms. However, BSOs working within major airport terminals are not authorized to be armed and must instead store and lock their firearms.

2021 strike 
In August 2021, around 8,500 employees of the Agency represented by the Public Service Alliance of Canada and the Customs and Immigration Union went on a work-to-rule strike, just days before COVID-19 restrictions on crossing the Canada–United States border were due to be eased. Having been without a collective bargaining agreement since 2018, the demands of the strike were an increase in salaries to reach equality with other law enforcement officials in Canada, increased protections against harassment and discrimination, as well as the implementation of a policy to allow non-uniformed officials to work from home. An agreement was reached between the workers and the Canadian government in the evening of the same day, ending the strike after one day.

Policy and legislation

Independent Complaint Review Commission 
A report ordered by the federal government in 2017 urged for the creation of a new independent oversight committee to monitor, address, and investigate complaints against the CBSA. Currently, CBSA has no independent civilian oversight. It is considered an unusual situation by many provincial law associations as nearly every policing agency in Canada has some form of independent oversight body. The Liberal government announced in 2019 a budget allocating $24 million over five years, to expand the mandate of the Civilian Review and Complaints Commission. The commission will provide service to both RCMP and CBSA. The proposed legislation (Bill C-98) was pending enactment, but did not clear the senate before the end of the parliamentary session in June 2019.

Electronic privacy rights at the border

Search protocols 
CBSA policy and protocols for searching electronic devices have changed significantly in recent years. New and updated examination protocols now include:

 Searching the device only in airplane mode.
 Not accessing apps or software that connects to "the cloud".
 Officers must take detailed notes before, after and during the search.
 Officers should receive adequate training and accurately follow published CBSA policies.
 Officers must be able to articulate why the device is being searched in their notes.
 If you feel that you are in legal jeopardy, you are allowed to request consultation with legal representation.
 Files or folders labeled as 'solicitor-client privilege' will not be immediately searched. The device may be set aside for a court to inspect.

Reformation 
On 7 January 2020, Privacy Commissioner Daniel Therrien announced that the Agency had violated the law by carrying out unduly invasive searches of personal digital devices. Therrien filed a recommendation to parliament to have the border agency's guidelines for examination of digital devices written into the Customs Act and says the threshold to trigger a search should be defined in law as "reasonable grounds to suspect" a crime or customs infraction. In response to Therrien's comments, CBSA released a press statement announcing statistics on device searches. Legal analysts have speculated that the numbers released may be inaccurate.

Operations

Border Services Officers 
A Border Services Officer (BSO) is a federal law enforcement officer employed by the Canada Border Services Agency. While "Border Services Officer" is the overarching term for the CBSA's front-line personnel, it is actually not a title derived from legislation. Rather, BSOs receive multiple legislative designations such as "Customs Officer" under the Customs Act; "Immigration Officer" under the Immigration and Refugee Protection Act; and "Screening Officer" under the Quarantine Act. When enforcing customs- or immigration-related legislation, BSOs are Peace Officers under the Criminal Code. However, they can only make arrests for offences under the Criminal Code if they are appointed as "designated officers" by the minister of public safety under the Customs Act (section 163.4) and are at customs offices performing the normal duties of an officer or in accordance with Section 99.1 of the Customs Act.

Currently, BSOs are equipped with handcuffs, pepper spray, batons, and Beretta PX4 Storm pistols. The arming initiative began in 2007 and officially concluded in 2016. BSOs are trained at the CBSA College, located in Rigaud, Quebec. The training begins with a 4-week online program called the "Pre-OITP," followed by an 18-week program called the CBSA Officer Induction Training Program (OITP) which covers a range of topics from law (such as criminal law, immigration and customs legislation) to control and defensive tactics.

Immigration 
The CBSA plays a key role in immigration to Canada, as it has assumed the port-of-entry and enforcement mandates formerly held by Citizenship and Immigration Canada. CBSA officers work on the front lines, screening persons entering the country and removing those who are unlawfully in Canada.

As of the end of 2003, there were up to 200,000 illegal immigrants in Canada (most residing in Ontario). Most are refugee claimants whose refugee applications were rejected by the Immigration and Refugee Board of Canada. There are very few illegal immigrants who enter the country without first being examined by the CBSA. The reason for this is that Canada is physically very difficult to get to, with the exception of crossing the Canada/U.S. border. As the U.S. is itself a prime destination for illegal immigrants, not many illegal immigrants then attempt to cross the border into Canada in the wild.

There has been a recent increase in the number of illegal entrants from St. Pierre & Miquelon who travel in makeshift boats. High unemployment in the French colony has spurred this increase, which has been acknowledged by the Government of France. The CBSA and Royal Canadian Navy are considering increased marine patrols to intercept the illegal migrants. While residents could lawfully travel to France, the expensive airfare has made the relatively short  boat ride to the Canadian province of Newfoundland and Labrador more attractive for destitute economic migrants.

Examinations, searches, and seizures 
All persons and goods entering Canada are subject to examination by CBSA officers. An examination can be as simple as a few questions, but can also include an examination of the subject's vehicle and/or luggage, electronic devices, more intensive questioning, or strip-searches. The intensity of an examination depends on the reasonable suspicion that the officer has to escalate the intensiveness of a search. CBSA Officers must adhere to strict search protocols, guidelines and procedures during the examination process.

Examinations are performed to ensure compliance with customs and immigration legislation. CBSA officers are given their authority by the Customs Act and the Immigration and Refugee Protection Act (IRPA). In addition, BSOs are also able to enforce other Acts of Parliament as they are designated as Peace Officers under the Criminal Code.

The agency will also seize items it labels obscene, as it did in February 2009 when it detained and banned two films by the adult film director Michael Lucas. CBSA's Policy On The Classification Of Obscene Material states that the "ingestion of someone else's urine... with a sexual purpose" makes a film obscene.

In 2000, after a ten-year-long controversy over items the agency labelled obscene, the case reached the British Columbia Supreme Court. One judge in the case concluded not only that Border officials had wrongly delayed, confiscated, destroyed, damaged, prohibited or mis-classified materials imported by the appellant on numerous occasions, but that these errors were caused "by the systemic targeting of Little Sisters' importations in the Vancouver Customs.

Enforcement & Intelligence

Criminal Investigations and prosecutions 
The Criminal Investigations unit of CBSA is tasked with investigating and pursuing prosecution of those who commit criminal offences against Canada's border legislation. CBSA investigators are responsible for operational activities including:

 Investigation of fraudulent activities related to the importation/exportation of goods and the movement of people;
 Reviewing leads, researching, gathering evidence;
 Conducting forensic examinations on digital devices and media;
 Execution of search warrants;
 Preparation and serving of documents (e.g. corrective, civil, criminal);
 Assisting foreign customs administrations with their investigation of customs offences (CMAA, MLAT); and
Criminal prosecutions (preparing a Crown Briefs, recommending specific charges, assisting the Public Prosecution Service of Canada).

Intelligence 

The CBSA maintains a robust and comprehensive Intelligence program, which is mandated to provide timely, accurate and relevant intelligence support to operational decision makers at all levels within the Agency. Information is lawfully collected from a variety of sources, including open and closed source materials, domestic and international intelligence partners, joint operations with other law enforcement agencies, sophisticated technical means, covert surveillance, and informants/human intelligence. Intelligence officers and analysts are deployed within Canada—along the borders and throughout the country—as well as overseas.

The agency turns the information it collects into intelligence by using automated risk analysis, analytical tools, and risk management. This allows it to work toward its objective of balancing security concerns with the need to facilitate the flow of people and goods. The agency seeks to manage risks through a number of means; including the collection and analysis of intelligence information; the use of detection tools; the analysis of indicators and judgment of front-line officers; and random checks.

Threat and risk assessments are widely recognized as valuable decision-making tools when setting examination priorities. The agency's intelligence directorate conducts a border risk assessment of its border operations every 2–3 years. Under this process, the agency assesses the risks of smuggling contraband, such as drugs, firearms, proceeds of crime, child pornography, illicit tobacco etc. The information is assessed and ranked by commodity and by mode of transport. The agency will include the risks of irregular or illegal migration of people, and the movement of food, plants, and animals, now under the agency's broader mandate, in the next version of its border risk assessment.

The agency also prepares a national port risk assessment every two years. The agency assessed the relative risk to 168 ports of entry in 2006 and 220 in 2004. Regional intelligence analysts, in consultation with other sources and port operational staff, complete a questionnaire detailing port demographics, traffic volume, enforcement, and intelligence information. The 2006 risk assessment ranked 23 ports as high-risk and included information on suspected criminal and national security risks, as well as the risk of irregular or illegal migration of people.

In addition to the border and port risk assessment processes, the intelligence directorate provides daily, weekly and monthly updates on specific threats and trends in unlawful activities. Intelligence officers and analysts frequently participate in tactical and operational law enforcement activities such as search warrants, arrests, surveillance, the recruitment and retention of confidential informers, interviews of detainees and the analysis of seized goods and evidence.

Border Watch 
The CBSA Border Watch toll-free info line offers citizens the opportunity to report suspicious cross border activity directly to the agency in a direct and confidential manner. The Border Watch line differs from other phone lines for the public, such as CrimeStoppers or the RCMP info line in that it is designed to focus directly on border-related intelligence.

Detector Dog Service (DDS) 
Detector dogs begin training between the ages of 11 and 16 months and work for an average of 8 to 10 years. Several different breeds are used, but the CBSA primarily uses Labrador Retrievers for firearm, drug, and currency detection, while using the Beagle for plant, food and animal detection. Dogs live with their handler full-time. While the dog is at work, it is transported in air-conditioned vehicles that act as a mobile kennel.

The AMPS program, implemented in December 2005, is a system that encourages compliance with customs legislation through the tendering of monetary penalties. It is used mainly as an enforcement tool on technical infractions, where the subject did not necessarily intend to breach the legislation, but failed to comply in some way. For more serious or deliberate infractions, the goods in question may be seized or subject to forfeiture. AMPS penalties are imposed depending on the severity and frequency of the infraction. Multiple infractions will result in higher penalties under the AMPS system.

The CBSA's use of detector dogs began with three canine units at the Windsor port of entry in 1978. The program has since expanded to include 69 detector dog teams located at ports across Canada. Detector dogs work in mail, air, land and marine facilities. Each dog is trained to detect specific commodities, and are generally trained to fit into one of four profiles:

Narcotics, explosives, and firearms;
Currency;
Tobacco; or
Food, plant, and animal (FPA)

Role 
Detector dogs provide BSOs with one of the most effective tools in the detection of contraband. Although other tools are available to BSOs, detector dogs are highly efficient in their ability to accurately locate the source of a scent, and thus can save time in labour-intensive examinations of vehicles, luggage, and cargo. This speeds up the process for BSOs as well as for the travelling public.

The CBSA uses passive detector dogs, unlike some other law enforcement agencies, which use active dogs. When a passive dog detects a scent that it has been trained to recognize, it sits beside the source of the smell. While active dogs, which bark, scratch, dig or bite at the source of the scent, were used initially by the CBSA, passive dogs allow the officer to circulate among passengers more peacefully, and are considered by the Agency to be more effective in the course of their work. The Passive Dog training was implemented in 1993, and is now the Agency's preference.

Training 
Detector Dog teams (consisting of a dog and a single handler) undergo a 10-week training course at the CBSA Learning Centre. The handlers are Border Services Officers, and are trained on how to care for, maintain, and train their dogs. They are also trained to understand the "Cone of Scent;" odour particles always disperse in the shape of a cone: more concentrated at the source, and less concentrated farther away. After the initial training, the handler must keep up a training regimen to ensure their dog remains in top form. Only about 1 in 10 dogs who begin the training eventually become detector dogs.

While there is no specific description for a detector dog, the CBSA looks for certain characteristics that make a better potential detector dog, including:

 Ability and desire to retrieve
 Good physical condition
 Alertness
 Sociability
 Boldness
 Temperament

Canada–US cooperation 
One of the central purposes for the CBSA's creation was to address heightened security concerns post-9/11, and to respond to criticisms that Canada was not doing enough to ensure the security of North America, especially from the United States, who had begun substantial changes years prior to the 2001 attacks. In the wake of the September 11 attacks on the United States, Canada's border operations had to place enhanced emphasis on national security and public safety. As result, the United States established the Department of Homeland Security (DHS) led by Secretary Tom Ridge, who would partner with Canada's Deputy Prime Minister at the time, John Manley, to create the bi-national Smart Border Declaration in December 2001. The declaration would provide objectives for co-operation between Canadian-American border operations.

Smart Border Declaration and Action Plan 

The Smart Border Declaration and Action Plan, also known as the Smart Border Accord, was signed in 2001 and is an initiative of the Government of Canada—specifically the CBSA, RCMP, and the Department of Foreign Affairs and International Trade— and the United States Government—particularly the Department of Homeland Security (DHS), CBP, and the U.S. Coast Guard. The two major signatories to the Declaration were Canadian Deputy Prime Minister John Manley and then-US Director of Homeland Security Tom Ridge.

The accord was set up in order to facilitate the cross-border flow of travellers and goods, consisting of 30 points of common interest to improve both security and trade between the two countries. Included in the plan are initiatives to improve the biometric features of Permanent Resident Cards in both Canada and the US, sharing Advanced Passenger Information and creating compatible immigration databases.

There are four main pillars to the Action Plan:

 Secure flow of people;
 Secure flow of goods;
 Investing in secure infrastructure; and
 Coordination and information sharing in the enforcement of these objectives

Canada–United States Integrated Border Enforcement Teams 
Integrated Border Enforcement Teams (IBETs) were created as a part of the Accord to consolidate the law-enforcement and intelligence-gathering expertise of different agencies in both countries. The IBETs consist of members from the CBSA, RCMP, CBP, U.S. Coast Guard, and U.S. ICE Teams. However, IBETs also enlists the help of other municipal, state/provincial, and federal agencies on certain projects.

In Canada, IBETs operate in 15 regions across the Canada-U.S. border in air, sea and land modes. They are based on a model started along the B.C.-Washington state border in 1996. Since their inception, IBETs have helped disrupt smuggling rings involved in the drug trade, alcohol, tobacco, grand theft auto, and human trafficking.
The Dodge Charger is currently used by the CBSA's Inland Enforcement Program, while the Ford Explorer, the Ford Police Interceptor Sedan, the Dodge Caravan and Ford F-250 are used at port of entries. Other vehicles include the Chevrolet Impala, the Chevrolet Tahoe, the Ford F-350, the Ford E-250, the Dodge RAM, the Chevrolet Silverado and a Navistar International HV used as the agency's X-RAY truck.

Organization

CBSA regions and branches 
The CBSA has seven regions across Canada, including Atlantic Region, Greater Toronto Area Region, Northern Ontario Region, Pacific Region, Prairie Region, Quebec Region, and Southern Ontario Region. The Agency consists of nine branches and one group reporting directly to the President.

 CBSA Assessment and Revenue Management
 Chief Transformation Officer
 Commercial and Trade
 Finance and Corporate Management
 Human Resources
 Information, Science and Technology
 Intelligence and Enforcement
 Internal Audit and Program Evaluation (direct report)
 Strategic Policy
 Travellers

CBSA organizational structure 
John Ossowski has been the president of the CBSA since December 7, 2016. Prior to his current appointment, Ossowski was deputy commissioner of the CRA, starting in July 2015. He previously served in positions at Public Safety Canada, the Treasury Board of Canada Secretariat (TBS), Communications Security Establishment (CSE), and the Financial Transactions and Reports Analysis Centre of Canada (FINTRAC).

Insignia 
In addition to using generic identifiers imposed by the Federal Identity Program (FIP), the CBSA is one of several federal departments (primarily those involved with law enforcement, security, or having a regulatory function) that has been granted heraldic symbols by the Canadian Heraldic Authority.

The coat of arms was granted on June 15, 2010, and presented by Queen Elizabeth II on July 6, 2010. The ceremony was the Queen's last function on her 2010 Canadian Royal Tour. Also in attendance were Governor General Michaëlle Jean and Prime Minister Stephen Harper. Use of the coat of arms is reserved for special occasions, and it is normally associated with the office of the CBSA president.

The heraldic badge was approved for use at the same time as the coat of arms. It portrays a gold tressure, which symbolizes the agency's security focus. The portcullis represents Her Majesty's agents responsible for border services. The Latin motto  translates into English as "Protection, Service, Integrity". The badge figures prominently in the television series Border Security: Canada's Front Line.

A flag was granted by the Canadian Heraldic Authority on December 20, 2012. It is meant to resemble the Canadian Blue Ensign, which was flown on government vessels (including those patrolling Canada's maritime borders) prior to 1965.

Commerce and trade

Customs Act 

The Customs Act (1985) is one of the key pieces of legislation governing the CBSA mandate. It was first enacted in 1867 to:

 "ensure the collection of duties;"
 "control the movement of people and goods into and out of Canada;" and
 "protect Canadian industry from real or potential injury caused by the actual or contemplated import of dumped or subsidized goods and by other forms of unfair competition."

Rather than being a taxing statute itself, the Customs Act provides "legislative authority to administer and enforce the collection of duties and taxes that are imposed under separate taxing legislation, such as the Customs Tariff, the Excise Tax Act, the Excise Act, and the Special Import Measures Act." The Act was revised in 1986 to allow for greater flexibility in modern transportation, communication, trade, and business practices. Accordingly, since 1986, the Act has been amended several times in response to free trade and other related international agreements.

Customs Self Assessment 
The Customs Self Assessment program gives approved importers a streamlined accounting and paying process for all imported goods. Importers are required to apply for acceptance into the program

Advance Commercial Information 
Advance Commercial Information (ACI) is a major ongoing project of the CBSA that requires waterborne and airborne cargo entering Canada to be registered with the Agency. Assisting officials at seaports and airports in their inspections, the program allows for the tracking of suspicious materials. These phases of the project were implemented in 2005, with a similar highway and rail cargo program to follow in the near future.

By comparison, ACI is similar to the United States-based Automated Manifest System (AMS). The project's aim is to improve border security and efficiency, and once completely implemented, ACI will require that all commercial cargo entering Canada be electronically registered with the CBSA.

History 
In 2000, then-Minister of National Revenue Martin Cauchon introduced the objectives that would lead to ACI as part of the Customs Action Plan. After the September 11 attacks against the United States, the security benefits associated with the project took on a new importance. In the Canada-US Smart Border Declaration created in December of that year, then-Foreign Affairs Minister John Manley and U.S. Secretary of Homeland Security Tom Ridge called for "a system to collaborate in identifying high risk goods while expediting the flow of low risk goods."

The idea for ACI was based on the American Container Security Initiative (CSI) that created preclearance rules. With the CSI effectively posting custom officers in foreign ports around the world, Canada was under significant pressure to introduce a similar plan or face the reality that CBP officers would be placed in Canadian ports. As this would be a very visible loss of Canadian sovereignty, the CBSA quickly came up with the ACI plan.

Implementation and enforcement 
Phase 1 of ACI came into effect 19 April 2004. Data on shipborne cargo must be transmitted to CBSA no later than 24 hours prior to the loading of the cargo. The data is available to Customs officials at each of Canada's major ports, and any anomalies can be investigated by mobile teams with secure, wireless access to the database.  Sensors have also been installed to detect unusual radiation levels in cargo.

Phase 2 saw these measures extended to air cargo, and ACI systems were installed in airports across Canada. This phase went into effect in July 2006. ACI Phase 2 also expanded marine requirements to include shipments loaded in the United States.

Phase 3 implemented eManifest, which requires the electronic transmission of advance cargo and conveyance information from carriers for all highway and rail shipments. In addition, the electronic transmission of advance secondary data became required from freight forwarders and the advance importer data became a requirement from importers or their brokers.

Incidents and controversies

Search of digital devices 
Whilst the laws surrounding electronic privacy rights at the border are currently considered unsettled, a number of new court cases are raising the issue that personal electronic devices (such as cell phones and laptops) should be afforded a higher level of privacy.

In August 2018, the British Columbia Civil Liberties Association (BCCLA) published a guide surrounding searches of electronic devices at the border. The guide was distributed by major media outlets in Canada. The BCCLA guide cautions travelers that Canadian courts have not yet established if searches of electronic devices without suspicion are considered “an unreasonable invasion of privacy”. Travelers crossing the border are advised by the BCCLA to minimize the data that is stored on their devices to mitigate risk.

On November 12, 2019, a federal court in Boston, USA ruled that the government must have reasonable suspicion of digital contraband before searching electronic devices at U.S. border crossings. The judgement has ignited speculation that Canada should have updated legislation surrounding this area of law.

Philippon 
In March 2015, Alain Philippon, from Ste-Anne-des-Plaines, Quebec, was referred to secondary inspection after returning from a trip to the Dominican Republic. During the inspection, Philippon refused CBSA officers' request to disclose the password to his phone. Philippon was then charged with hindering an officer's job under section 153.1(b) of the Customs Act, which carries a maximum sentence of twelve-months' imprisonment and a  fine. Following his arrest, Philippon said that he would fight the charge as he considered his phone to be "personal." His case would receive national and international attention, with several organizations arguing that the right to privacy granted by the Charter could extend to electronic devices at the border, especially in light of recent Supreme Court case law.

In August 2016, Philippon entered a guilty plea and was ordered to pay a  fine. The plea meant that no Charter challenge was to be raised, thus leaving unanswered the question of whether or not refusing to provide a password to a customs officer is considered hindering.

Singh 
In January 2018, Gurbir Singh, an Indian national studying in Canada, was arrested by CBSA officers and subsequently charged with possession of child pornography. Singh was initially questioned to determine his admissibility into Canada under the Immigration and Refugee Protection Act. After a search of Singh's cell phone revealed a photo suspected to be child pornography, Officer Buechert focused his search exclusively on child pornography. Officer Buechert originally sought to continue his search on the basis of gathering evidence for smuggling charges under the Customs Act, rather than a Criminal Code offense. Upon discovery of illicit images Officer Buechert contacted the Ontario Provincial Police, who later pressed criminal charges upon Singh. Singh was subject to no charges under the Customs Act. Singh contested the inclusion of evidence from the CBSA search on his cell phone, arguing that the broad expansive search powers under the Customs Act would render the administration of justice in disrepute if it was applied to prosecute offenses under the Criminal Code.

On June 18, 2019, the Ontario Court of Justice decided to exclude the evidence against Singh. Justice Deluzio indicated that while broad search and interrogation powers are necessary for the security of Canadian borders, it was inappropriate to abuse such powers to solely further a criminal investigation that was outside the purview of protecting Canadian borders, considering Singh had no ability to refuse the search or further questioning, nor was a search warrant obtained.

Canfield 
In October 2020, the Alberta Court of Appeal ruled a federal Customs Act section dealing with inspection of goods violates the charter when it comes to searching digital devices. The court found the Canada Border Services Agency infringed on the rights of two men charged with pornography offences after a search of their cell phones at the Edmonton international airport.  It wrote their rights were violated under s 8 of the Charter of Rights and Freedoms, which says everyone has "the right to be secure against unreasonable search and seizure," and s 10, which specifies rights upon arrest or detention, including the right to consult a lawyer and the right to habeas corpus.

The decision is significant because it is one of a handful of cases where a lower court has ever revisited a Supreme Court of Canada decision.

The court also suspended the declaration of invalidity of the relevant section of the Customs Act for one year to provide Parliament with the opportunity to amend the legislation to determine how to address searches of personal electronic devices at the border.

Despite the violation of charter rights, the appeal court decided to allow the inclusion of evidence obtained by CBSA.

On March 11, 2021, the Supreme Court of Canada dismissed the applicants leave to appeal. The court did not provide any additional commentary on the decision.

Crown counsel applied for a six month extension to the suspension of Customs Act provision. The extension was granted by the Court of Appeal on October 22, 2021. 

As of May, 2022, changes to the Customs Act provision have not been changed or implemented.  

On April 20, 2022 Justices Jo’Anne Strekaf and Ritu Khullar denied the government’s request for a second six-month extension, writing that “public confidence is undermined when a law that has been declared to be unconstitutional continues to have effect in other than extraordinary circumstances.”

Peace Arch Border Crossing 
In 2010, CBSA Officer Daniel Greenhalgh from BC's Peace Arch border crossing was convicted of sexually assaulting women in three separate incidents after ordering at least four unauthorized strip searches.

On October 16, 2012, Andrew Crews, an American, shot CBSA Officer Lori Bowcock in the neck before killing himself. Bowcock survived. This was the first time since CBSA's inception that an officer was shot while on duty.

Deaths in custody 
Since 2000, at least 13 people have died while in the custody of the CBSA and its predecessor, with the two most recent deaths occurring in the span of a week in two separate incidents in March 2016. Following the latest incidents in 2016, several organizations reacted and called for an immigration detention reform. The CBSA remains one of the few enforcement agencies in Canada without an independent and external oversight body.

TV show 

Beginning in 2012, the CBSA participated in a TV documentary series produced by National Geographic called Border Security: Canada's Front Line. The show was similar in format to the Australian version, in that it would follow CBSA officers from various ports, as well as Inland Enforcement teams. The show had attracted criticism from the British Columbia Civil Liberties Association and the Canadian Bar Association due to its approach to privacy rights and its one-sided narrative.

In 2013, while filming for the show, the CBSA conducted a raid on a construction site in Vancouver, leading to the arrest of a Mexican national, Oscar Mata Duran. Duran was taken to an immigration detention centre, where he would be presented with a filming consent form. Canada's Privacy Commissioner investigated after receiving a complaint from Duran. The Commissioner found that the CBSA breached Canada's Privacy Act by filming their interaction with Duran before he was advised of the purposes of filming, and found that the coercive nature of being detained in a holding facility would have prevented Duran from providing informed consent for his appearance. The Commissioner lauded Duran as a real hero for lodging the privacy complaint even though he would not personally benefit from it. Duran was deported following the raid. In light of Duran's complaint, the Privacy Commissioner recommended that the CBSA end its participation in the show, after which the CBSA announced that the show would not return for a fourth season. Most of the film locations included Toronto Pearson International Airport ,  Montréal–Pierre Elliott Trudeau International Airport ,  Peace Bridge (QEW), BC 15 and BC 99 Peace Arch. These can be found in the Hyperlinks and on the official Wikipedia page: Border Security: Canada's Front Line.

See also 

Royal Canadian Mounted Police
Visa policy of Canada
Tourism in Canada
List of Canada–United States border crossings
US entry into Canada by land
NEXUS
CANPASS
Passport Canada
 Correctional Service of Canada
 Global Affairs Canada
 US Customs and Border Protection
 UK Visas and Immigration

References

External links 

 
 CBSA Wanted List
 Smart Border 30-Point Action Plan
 Canada Nexus Border crossing system —Educational video on ID cards with RFID chips
 Integrated Border Enforcement Teams
 IBETs 2006 Joint Cross-Border Operations
 Chapter 5—Keeping the Border Open and Secure—Canada Border Services Agency
 Gomorrahy.com—Archives CBSA Quarterly List of Admissible and Prohibited Titles
ACI Information Page at CBSA
 

Federal departments and agencies of Canada
Border guards
Borders of Canada
Customs services
Border Services Agency
Government agencies established in 2003
Border Services Agency
2003 establishments in Canada
Foreign trade of Canada
Public Safety Canada
Migration-related organizations based in Canada